Banka Assembly constituency is one of 243 constituencies of legislative assembly of Bihar. It is part of Banka Lok Sabha constituency along with other assembly constituencies viz. Amarpur, Katoria, Belhar and Dhoraiya. In 2015 Bihar Legislative Assembly election, Banka was one of the 36 seats to have VVPAT enabled electronic voting machines.

Overview
Banka comprises CD Blocks Barahat & Banka.

Members of Legislative Assembly

Election results

2020

2015

References

External links
 

Politics of Banka district
Assembly constituencies of Bihar